Shakir Lashari (born 24 March 1984) is a Pakistani professional footballer who plays for Pakistan Airlines F.C.

He started his career with Lyari Labour Welfare Centre, playing in non-league 2003 KASB Bank Premier League (Karachi), where his team finished on 3rd position. After the end of season, Lashari joined Lyari Blues, with them he played Lyari Festival Football Tournament, playing the all three games and scoring his only goal in the finals in 32nd minutes to secure a 1–0 win over Lyari Grey.

Lashari joined Karachi Electric Supply Corporation in 2004–05 season, competing in 2004–05 Football Federation League, the second division of Pakistani football. Lashari played an important role in the team as Karachi Electric Supply Corporation earned promotion to 2005–06 Pakistan Premier League, after finishing second to Pakistan Railways.

Club career

Non-league
Born in Karachi, Sindh, Lashari started his career with Lyari Labour Welfare Centre, with whom he competed in 2003 KASB Premier League (Karachi). Lashari played a vital role as his team finished third in the league, with Lashari scoring six goals in nine appearances, including a brace in a 4–0 victory against Bhutta Muhammaden. After the end of season, Lashari joined Lyari Blues, with them he played Lyari Festival Football Tournament, playing the all three games and scoring his only goal in the finals in 32nd minutes to secure a 1–0 win over Lyari Grey.

Karachi Electric Supply Corporation

2005–06
In 2005–06 season, Lashari joined Karachi Electric Supply Corporation playing in Football Federation League. Lashari scored on his league debut in a 3–0 victory over Baloch Nushki on 17 January 2005 and went on to score three goals in five matches, as they earned promotion to 2006–07 Pakistan Premier League, top-flight of Pakistani football. Lashari competed in 2005 National Football Challenge Cup with Karachi Electric Supply Corporation, his first ever game for team was a 3–1 win over Korangi Rangers, Lashari scored hat-trick on his debut for the team scoring goals in 33rd, 78th and 79th minutes. In the next game against Naka Muhammaden, Lashari scored a brace scoring in 21st and 49th minutes as his team routed Naka Muhammaden 6–0. Lashari scored six goals in six games, scoring in a semi-finals draw 1–1 draw against Pakistan Navy and in a 1–0 third place victory over Pakistan Public Work Department.

2006–07
In 2006–07 Pakistan Premier League, Lashari scored just 2 goals in 20 appearances for the club as they finished sixth in the league.

Pakistan Airlines

2007–08
Lashari joined Pakistan Airlines before the start of 2007–08 season, after a not good start in previous season, Lashari improved in this season, scoring 10 goals in 26 appearances, including a brace in a 2–0 win over Wohaib, scoring in 55th and 80th minutes.

2008–09
In 2008–09 season, Lashari scored his first-ever top-flight league hat-trick as Pakistan Airlines trashed Pakistan Television 4–0, with Lashari completing his hat-trick in 54 minutes, scoring in 21st, 36th and 75th minutes. Lashari ended season with 16 goals in 26 matches, his highest ever. Lashari ended runners-up in 2009 National Football Challenge Cup, when Pakistan Airlines lost 1–0 to Khan Research Laboratories.

2009–10
In 2009–10 season Lashari scored his first of the season in a 3–2 loss to WAPDA, scoring in 31st minute as they went on to lose the game courtesy of Arif Mehmood hat-trick for WAPDA. Lashari scored a brace in a 5–0 thumping of Habib Bank when he scored opening and the last goal in 7th and 71st minutes respectively. Lashari found the net again twice in a 2–0 victory over his former club Karachi Electric Supply Corporation, scoring in the last ten minutes of the game. Lashari scored the equaliser for the Airlines against Karachi Port Trust, who went on to win after Zahid Ahmed scored the winner for the Portmen in the 68th minute. On 18 October 2009, Lashari scored third hat-trick of his career as Pakistan Airlines thumped Baloch Nushki 4–0, Lashari scored in 31st, 43rd and 88th minutes. Lashari's last goal came against Pak Elektron when he scored the second goal for team in 31st minutes as Pakistan Airlines won the match 3–0. Lashari scored a total of 10 goals in 26 matches.

Career Statistics

References

External links
 geosuper.tv

1984 births
Living people
Pakistani footballers
Pakistan international footballers
Footballers at the 2006 Asian Games
Association football forwards
Asian Games competitors for Pakistan